John Pugh (born 1957) is an American artist known for creating large trompe-l'œil wall murals giving the illusion of a three-dimensional scene behind the wall. Pugh has been creating his murals since the late 1970s. He attended California State University Chico, receiving his BA in 1983 and the Distinguished Alumni Award in 2003. He has received over 250 public and private commissions in the United States, Canada, Mexico, Barbados, Japan, Taiwan, and New Zealand. He currently lives and works in Truckee, California. His particular style of trompe-l'œil painting has been called "Narrative Illusionism."

His works have been described as "not merely ornamental or curiously clever. They are thought-provoking, substantial, and sometimes even philosophical or spiritual. What separates the murals of John Pugh from their less consequential cousins is that he goes beyond trompe l’oeil by combining techniques of illusion with narrative or conceptual elements and thereby not only “fools the eye” but captures the imagination and engages the mind as well."

Artist Statement 

"I am a trompe l’oeil artist focusing primarily on public art. I have found that the ‘language’ of life-size illusions allow me to effectively communicate with a very large audience. People take delight in being visually tricked. Once intrigued by the illusion, the viewer is invited to visually cross into the mural to explore and discover the deeper concept of the piece. I have also found that by creating architectural illusion that integrates with the existing environment both optically and aesthetically, the art transcends the separateness that public art sometimes produces.

Public art is a very powerful form of communication, and with it comes great responsibility. To truly connect with most viewers the concept message needs to be an authentic one and in no way commercial. People crave human connection. Ironically, this humanistic draw is the most effective way to spur economic development.

With a clear intention to create a public art attraction, I strive to design a mural in a way that is atypical or not in a commonplace mural format; that I “think of the box”. Often this includes creating an illusion that is iconic or a dynamic anomaly. The passerby is much more apt to engage with an uncommon architectural event or phenomenon while he or she unconsciously surveys the urban landscape.

Creating a ‘sense of place’ is paramount. It is important for me as an artist, to research the area and its community, formulating concepts based upon a multitude of historical, environmental, and cultural viewpoints. If the mural can serve to educate about the culture and heritage of a place, it will deepen roots, and create a pride of place. This inspires new possibilities, the sharing of ideas, and assist in bridging cultural gaps in the community.

Clarity of language allows the artwork to ‘elevate rather than alienate’, and with an initial trompe l’oeil impact that tantalizes the viewer, no translation is needed. Yet layers of heritage, the human spirit, or of dreams can be woven together in innovative ways — dynamic or subtle — that will inspire. I like to play with the mural composition so that the layers will unfold sequentially, creating a multi-dimensional narrative and prompting exploration. I also like to treat the layers as music, composing with color, texture, and form to create melodic overtones and the timbre. Ultimately the goal with the mural is to conjure fresh feelings and perceptions, and evoke a sense of connectivity with the mural, within us, and the world around us." -John Pugh

Gallery of Murals 
Partial listing of John Pugh's murals.

Further reading 
 Bruce, Kevin. Large Art in Small Places: Discovering the California Mural Towns. Ten Speed Press, May 2009, 192pp.
 Seckel, Al. Masters of Deception: Escher, Dalí & the Artists of Optical Illusion. Sterling, Aug 2007, 320pp.
 Bruce, Kevin. The Murals of John Pugh: Beyond Trompe L'Oeil. Ten Speed Press, Sept 2006, 168pp.

See also
 Standin' on the Corner Park – discusses the Pugh mural by that name
 Trompe-l'œil 
 Anamorphosis
 Murals
 Public art

References

External links
 John Pugh's Official Website
 Google Maps, Shows locations of John Pugh's most famous murals
 Urban Mirage: The Murals of John Pugh, Video documentary exploring John Pugh's approach to trompe-l'œil 
 CSU Chico, Article about John Pugh from the Fall 2002 edition of Chico Statements Magazine
 The Daily Telegraph, Picture gallery of John Pugh's work in the Daily Telegraph UK
 Creative Bloq, Article highlighting 30 mind-bending trompe l'oeil illusions
 Tahoe Quarterly Magazine, 2013 featured artist
 Trompe L’oeil The Perspective Illusionism of John Pugh, 2003 article by The Whole Mountain Source Book, Santa Cruz, CA

American muralists
Living people
California State University, Chico alumni
Trompe-l'œil artists
1957 births